Tihosuco is a town in the Mexican state of Quintana Roo, Mexico, localized in state center, in the municipality of Felipe Carrillo Puerto. The population was 4,994 inhabitants at the 2010 census.

References

Populated places in Quintana Roo